Stuart Goldsmith (born 1977) is an English actor, stand-up comedian and former street performer. He has presented the Comedian's Comedian podcast since 2012.

Career

Goldsmith grew up in Bristol and trained at Circomedia circus school. He was a member of the Playbox Theatre Company youth theatre group in Warwick, and worked as a court jester at Warwick Castle.

He began in street theatre as half of the comedy double act "Kiosk of Champions", with fellow stand-up Richard Sandling, where he "walked the tightrope eating a packet of crisps". Under the name "Beautiful Stu", he came second in the Street Performance World Championship in 2008. On his street theatre work, he has said "If you can draw in the crowd at 9.45am in Covent Garden it teaches you to be funny."

Goldsmith was a 2005 finalist in So You Think You're Funny, a 2006 finalist in Laughing Horse New Act of the Year, and came third in the Hackney Empire New Act of the Year. He was also a finalist in the BBC's Witty and Twisted competition. In 2011 Goldsmith competed in the ITV reality show Show Me the Funny, where he was eliminated in week 6.

Goldsmith's 2010 Edinburgh show Stuart Goldsmith: The Reasonable Man received positive reviews, as did his follow-up 2011 tour Another Lovely Crisis. His 2012 Edinburgh show Prick was the subject of some controversy after the title was censored by the Edinburgh Fringe Guide. Goldsmith received generally positive reviews for his 2014 and 2015 Edinburgh shows, Extra Life, and An Hour, respectively. His 2016 Edinburgh show is Compared to What. He continues to perform stand-up at clubs and festivals.

In 2012 Goldsmith launched a podcast - The Comedian's Comedian with Stuart Goldsmith - where in each episode he interviews a comedian about how they approach their profession. It published its 200th episode in March 2017.

Television
Goldsmith played the role of Caleb in the 2010 CBBC sci-fi gameshow Mission: 2110. He has also appeared as a guest on the Dave series As Yet Untitled with Alan Davies.

In 2016, Goldsmith appeared as a panelist on children's panel show The Dog Ate My Homework.

References

External links
 
 

English male comedians
Living people
1977 births
Male actors from Bristol